The Pimlico Nursery Stakes was a race for Thoroughbred horses run at Pimlico Race Course from 1909 through 1947.  Open to two-year-old horses of either sex, it was run on a dirt track.

Distances: 
1909-1937, 1943, 1945: 4½ furlongs
1938-1942, 1944, 1946-1947: 5 furlongs

Records
Speed record:
 Lady Gunner - 0:53.00 for 4½ furlongs in 1945
 Dockstader - 1:00.20 for 5 furlongs in 1944

Most wins by a jockey:
 4 - Eddie Ambrose (1915, 1917, 1919, 1929)

Most wins by a trainer:
 3 - William M. Garth (1913, 1921, 1923)
 3 - Preston M. Burch (1928, 1932, 1936)

Most wins by an owner:
 3 - Samuel Ross (1909,1916, 1930)
 3 - Sarah F. Jeffords (1926, 1929, 1936)
 3 - Ella K. Bryson (1940, 1941, 1947)

Winners

References

Discontinued horse races
Flat horse races for two-year-olds
Horse races in Maryland
Pimlico Race Course
Recurring sporting events established in 1909
Recurring sporting events disestablished in 1947